Kenneth A. May is the former CEO of FedEx Office, and chairman of the March of Dimes' board of trustees. In November 2011, he was appointed president of Krispy Kreme, and later in July 2014, May became president and CEO of Topgolf International, Inc. In November 2018, May joined golf entertainment company, Drive Shack Inc., where he is currently CEO.

Early life and education
Born in Memphis, Tennessee, May attended Harding Academy there.  A graduate of the University of Memphis and the University of Tennessee, May holds a master's degree in business administration from the latter.

Philanthropy

May has a daughter Alexa, who was born 12 weeks prematurely. The  baby was kept in a neonatal intensive care unit for three months. May credits March of Dimes research with his daughter's survival. He became a volunteer, and was elected to their national board in 2004.

Career

UPS
May began his career as a part-time supervisor at the United Parcel Service (UPS) and worked there for three years but had no intention of becoming a UPS truck driver — a prerequisite for full-time work with the company — given his college degree.

FedEx
In 1982 he interviewed with FedEx's Memphis hub and became a night-shift supervisor.  He shipped 162,000 packages his first day. He never intended to stay with the company, expecting to only be there six months. He received a total of 13 promotions, becoming senior vice president of the domestic ground operations division of FedEx Express (where he managed 60,000 employees and oversaw all US operations), as well as senior vice president of their air-ground and freight services division.

Kinko's
In 2002, Kinko's CEO Gary Kusin tried to hire May to become his chief operating officer, an offer the latter declined.  May would become the CEO of the faltering company in January 2006, after FedEx bought the chain of stores in 2004.  During his two-year tenure, May experimented with the chain's formula: changing stores' sizes, formats, and merchandise, as well as implementing "a kind of hub-and-spoke system [where] one large store would handle big print jobs for surrounding small ones."  When May took the reins of FedEx Kinko's, the 22,000-employee company had a turnover rate of 80 percent; two years later, in January 2008, turnover was down to 18 percent, and complaints had fallen by 65 percent.

May described his style as "based on being courageous enough to be bold", which included admitting mistakes and caring about people.  Priding himself on his personable relationships with the chain's employees, May wrote upwards of 25–50 notes a week congratulating employees on birthdays, promotions, new babies, and achievements.

In early 2006, May was the subject of a Time article titled "People to Watch In International Business" in which author Jeremy Caplan opined that the 45-year-old May "won't reprint his résumé anytime soon."  Kenneth May resigned as CEO of FedEx Office effective  after a falling out with the corporation over future strategy of the copy chain; replacing May was his COO, Brian Philips.  After the announcement, FedEx shares fell $1.77, or about 2 percent.

Krispy Kreme
On 28 November 2011, May became president of Krispy Kreme.

Topgolf
In July 2013, May joined Topgolf as its chief operating officer. In July 2014, he was promoted to president and chief executive officer.

Drive Shack
In November 2018, May was named CEO and president of Drive Shack Inc. which owns and operates golf-related leisure and entertainment businesses.

References

Living people
Year of birth missing (living people)
University of Memphis alumni
University of Tennessee alumni
American chief executives
People from Memphis, Tennessee
FedEx people
American chief operating officers